Vanilla Sky is a 2001 American science fiction thriller film directed, written, and co-produced by Cameron Crowe. It is an English-language remake of Alejandro Amenábar's 1997 Spanish film Open Your Eyes, which was written by Amenábar and Mateo Gil. Penélope Cruz reprises her role from the original film.

The film has been described as "an odd mixture of science fiction, romance and reality warp". It stars Tom Cruise, Penélope Cruz, Cameron Diaz, Jason Lee and Kurt Russell. It was nominated for an Academy Award for Best Original Song, and Diaz was nominated for a Screen Actors Guild and Golden Globe Award.

The film has gained somewhat of a cult following.

Plot

David Aames, the owner of a large publishing company he inherited from his father, is in prison. Wearing a prosthetic mask, David tells his life story to court psychologist Dr. Curtis McCabe.

In flashbacks, David leaves the duties of the publisher to his father's trusted associates while living as a playboy in Manhattan. He is introduced to Sofia Serrano by his best friend, Brian Shelby, during a party. David and Sofia spend the night together at Sofia's apartment and fall in love, unaware that David's current lover, Julie Gianni, has followed them there. As David leaves, Julie offers him a ride, and soon reveals her jealousy of Sofia. She purposely crashes the car, killing herself and disfiguring David.

Doctors cannot repair David's face using plastic surgery, forcing him to wear a prosthetic mask, but the mental and physical scarring from the accident causes him to become withdrawn and depressed. Brian convinces David to join him and Sofia at a club. They leave him in the street outside the club after he becomes drunk and insults them.

The next day, Sofia returns and apologizes to David. She takes him home, the two form a relationship and he slowly begins to recover. Doctors find a way to repair David's face despite their prior prognosis. Later, he is plagued by bizarre experiences, such as brief flashbacks of his disfigurement and an encounter with a mysterious man at a bar who informs him that David is omnipotent, demonstrated by the entire bar falling silent at David's command. One day, while at Sofia's, David awakens to find himself in bed with Julie, whose face has replaced Sofia's in their photographs. In shock, he suffocates Julie. David is arrested and imprisoned and his facial disfigurement is mysteriously restored.

Dr. McCabe conducts several more interviews, which serve to help David to recall the name "Life Extension". Seeing a company with that name nearby, McCabe arranges to take David there under guard. Rebecca, a company representative, explains how Life Extension uses cryonic suspension to save those with terminal illnesses until a cure can be found, keeping them in a lucid dream state to otherwise exercise their mind. David realizes that he is in cryonic suspension and the world he inhabits is his own lucid dream, which has become a nightmare. He escapes McCabe and the guards while calling for "tech support", and rushes for the building's lobby, which is suddenly empty. An elevator opens, revealing the strange man from the bar.

As the elevator climbs to the top of an impossibly tall building, the man explains that he is Tech Support and that David has been in suspension for 150 years. Unable to face the twin traumas of the loss of his love, Sofia, and his facial injuries, he had opted for Life Extension to be woken when technology could repair his face, and left the publishing company in the hands of his father's associates. As part of the program, David had chosen to experience a lucid dream, in which his life would resume the morning after Sofia left him. However, a glitch in the software had caused other elements of his subconscious to distort his dream.

They emerge on the rooftop, high above the clouds. Tech Support tells David that while they have corrected the flaw, he now has a choice of either being returned to the dream or being restored to life, requiring a literal leap of faith off the roof that will wake him from his sleep. David chooses the latter, despite McCabe warning him against it. Before jumping, David envisions Brian and Sofia to say his goodbyes. He leaps from the edge of the building, and his life flashes before him.

David snaps awake as a female voice invites him to open his eyes.

Cast

Production

Development

After the American debut of Alejandro Amenábar's 1997 Spanish film Abre los ojos (Open Your Eyes) at the 1998 Sundance Film Festival, Tom Cruise and his producing partner Paula Wagner optioned the remake rights. Hoping to entice director Cameron Crowe, who collaborated with Cruise on Jerry Maguire, Cruise invited Crowe over to his house to view the film. Cruise has stated:

I've been offered a lot of films to buy and remake, and I never have because I felt it was too connected with the culture of that place, whatever country it was from. But this was a universal story that was still open-ended, that still felt like it needed another chapter to be told.

The title of the film is a reference to depictions of skies in certain paintings by Claude Monet. In addition to Monet's impressionistic artwork, the film's tone was derived from the acoustic ballad "By Way of Sorrow" by Julie Miller and a line from an early interview of Elvis Presley in which he said, "I feel lonely, even in a crowded room."

Filming
Principal photography for Vanilla Sky began in late 2000 and lasted six weeks. On November 12, 2000, shooting for the scene of the deserted Times Square in New York took place in the early hours of the day. A large section of traffic was blocked off around Times Square while the scene was shot. "There was a limit on how long the city would let us lock everything up even on an early Sunday morning when much of NYC would be slow getting up," said Steadicam operator Larry McConkey. "Several times we rehearsed with Steadicam and Crane including a mockup of an unmovable guardrail that we had to work the crane arm around. [Cruise] participated in these rehearsals as well so we shared a clear understanding of what my limitations and requirements would be."

Filming lasted for six weeks around the New York City area, which included scenes in Central Park, the Upper West Side, SoHo, and Brooklyn. One prominent location in the area was the Condé Nast Building that served as Aames Publishing and David's office. After filming finished in New York, production moved to Los Angeles, where the remaining interior shots were completed at Paramount Studios. Crowe intentionally left in shots of the World Trade Center after the September 11 attacks as a tribute.

Despite the film's distorted aspects of reality, the style of cinematography remains grounded for much of the film. "I didn't do anything that was overtly obvious, because the story revolves around the main character not knowing whether he's in a state of reality, a dream or a nightmare, so we want it to feel a little ambiguous," said cinematographer John Toll. "We want the audience to make discoveries as [Cruise]'s character does, rather than ahead of him." American Cinematographer magazine wrote a feature story on the lighting designer Lee Rose's work on the film.

Alternate ending
The 2015 Blu-ray release offers the option to watch the film with an alternative ending. This ending expands on the details at the end of the film. While it all leads to the same conclusion, there are additional scenes, alternative takes, and alternative dialogue.

After Rebecca describes the lucid dream, David rushes out of the room but does not immediately dash towards the elevator. He meets McCabe in the restroom who tries to convince him that this is all a hoax and a con and that his case is going to trial. David tells him that he's only in his imagination. Much like in the theatrical cut, the Beach Boys' "Good Vibrations" plays, but this version makes it clear that David hears the music and that he chose it; meanwhile McCabe tries to convince him there is no music.

At this point, David dashes out of the restroom for the elevator the way he does in the theatrical cut, but the scene in the lobby is expanded: David shoots the police officer who is firing at him and is then surrounded by a SWAT team whom McCabe tries to talk down, but the SWAT team fires at both of them. They black out and wake up in the emptied lobby where McCabe continues to applaud what he believes is a performance while David gets into the elevator with Ventura, who tells him what happened at the end of his real life.

Once they reach the roof, McCabe reenters again and his pleas to David not to believe Ventura become more and more desperate until he collapses onto the ground in despair. David's interaction with Sofia is extended as he tells her he loves her but "can't settle for a dream". He then jumps off the building, screaming "I want to wake up!" as images from his life flash before his eyes. He wakes up in bed and a voice tells him "Open your eyes. You're going to be fine."

Music

Vanilla Sky's score was by Crowe's then wife, Nancy Wilson, who also scored Jerry Maguire and Almost Famous. Wilson spent nine months on the film's music, which was done through experimentation of sound collages. "We were trying to balance out the heaviness of the story with sugary pop-culture music," she said. "We made sound collages of all kinds. We were channeling Brian Wilson to a large extent. I was recording things through hoses, around corners, playing guitars with cello bows, and with [music editor] Carl Kaller, we tried all kinds of wacky stuff. In the murder–sex scene sound collage, Cameron even used Brian Wilson's speaking voice from a Pet Sounds mix session."

The eponymous song from the soundtrack, written and recorded by Paul McCartney, was nominated for an Academy Award for Best Original Song. Additional songs featured included Radiohead's song "Everything in Its Right Place", and "Svefn-g-englar" by the Icelandic group Sigur Rós.

Interpretations
According to Cameron Crowe's commentary, there are five different interpretations of the ending:
 "Tech support" is telling the truth: 150 years have passed since Aames killed himself and subsequent events form a lucid dream.
 The entire film is a dream, evidenced by a sticker on Aames's car that reads "2/30/01" (February 30 does not occur in the Gregorian calendar).
 The events after the crash are a dream Aames has while comatose.
 The entire film is the plot of the book that Brian is writing.
 The entire film after the crash is a hallucination caused by drugs administered during Aames's reconstructive surgery.

Crowe notes that the presence of a "Vanilla Sky" during the morning reunion after the nightclub scene marks the first lucid dream scene, and that everything that follows is a dream.

Release
Vanilla Sky opened at #1 at the box office in the United States when it was first presented on December 14, 2001. The opening weekend took in a gross income of $25,015,518 (24.9%). The final domestic gross income was $100.61 million while the international gross income was slightly higher at $102.76m for a total worldwide gross income of $203,388,341.

Reception

Critical response
On Rotten Tomatoes the film has an approval rating of 43% based on reviews from 174 critics and an average rating of 5.30/10. The site's consensus states: "An ambitious mix of genres, Vanilla Sky collapses into an incoherent jumble. Cruise's performance lacks depth, and it's hard to feel sympathy for his narcissistic character." On Metacritic it has a score of 45 out of 100 based on 33 reviews, indicating "mixed or average reviews". Audiences polled by CinemaScore gave the film a grade "D−" on a scale from A to F.

Roger Ebert's printed review of Vanilla Sky awarded the film three out of four stars:  Ebert interpreted the ending as an explanation for "the mechanism of our confusion", rather than a device that tells "us for sure what actually happened." Film critic Richard Roeper ranked the film the second best of 2001.

Stephen Holden of The New York Times calls Vanilla Sky a "highly entertaining, erotic science-fiction thriller that takes Mr. Crowe into Steven Spielberg territory", but then says: "As it leaves behind the real world and begins exploring life as a waking dream (this year's most popular theme in Hollywood movies with lofty ideas), Vanilla Sky loosens its emotional grip and becomes a disorganised and abstract if still-intriguing meditation on parallel themes. One is the quest for eternal life and eternal youth; another is guilt and the ungovernable power of the unconscious mind to undermine science's utopian discoveries. David's redemption ultimately consists of his coming to grips with his own mortality, but that redemption lacks conviction."

Salon.com called Vanilla Sky an "aggressively plotted puzzle picture, which clutches many allegedly deep themes to its heaving bosom without uncovering even an onion-skin layer of insight into any of them." The review rhetorically asks: "Who would have thought that Cameron Crowe had a movie as bad as Vanilla Sky in him? It's a punishing picture, a betrayal of everything that Crowe has proved he knows how to do right. ... But the disheartening truth is that we can see Crowe taking all the right steps, the most Crowe-like steps, as he mounts a spectacle that overshoots boldness and ambition and idiosyncrasy and heads right for arrogance and pretension—and those last two are traits I never would have thought we'd have to ascribe to Crowe." Edward Guthmann of the San Francisco Chronicle gave the film 2/4 and wrote: "The film's aim—to dazzle and inspire—is sapped by Cruise's vein-popping, running-the-marathon performance."

Peter Bradshaw of The Guardian and Gareth Von Kallenbach of the publication Film Threat compared Vanilla Sky unfavorably to Open Your Eyes. Bradshaw says Open Your Eyes is "certainly more distinctive than" Vanilla Sky, which he describes as an "extraordinarily narcissistic high-concept vanity project for producer-star Tom Cruise." Other reviewers extrapolate from the knowledge that Cruise had bought the rights to do a version of Amenábar's film. A Village Voice reviewer characterized Vanilla Sky as "hauntingly frank about being a manifestation of its star's cosmic narcissism".

Kenneth Turan of the Los Angeles Times called Cameron Diaz "compelling as the embodiment of crazed sensuality" and The New York Times reviewer said she gives a "ferociously emotional" performance. Edward Guthmann of the San Francisco Chronicle similarly says of the film, "most impressive is Cameron Diaz, whose fatal-attraction stalker is both heartbreaking and terrifying." For her performance, Diaz won multiple critics' groups awards, as well as being nominated for the Golden Globe Award, Screen Actors Guild Award, Critics' Choice Movie Award, Saturn Award, and AFI Award. Penélope Cruz's performance, however, earned her a Razzie Award nomination for Worst Actress (in addition to her roles in Blow and Captain Corelli's Mandolin).

Awards and nominations

See also
 Simulated reality in fiction

References

External links

 Eyes and Ears for Vanilla Sky at Cameron Crowe's Official website
 
 

2001 films
2000s science fiction thriller films
2001 psychological thriller films
American psychological thriller films
American science fiction thriller films
American remakes of Spanish films
2000s English-language films
Cryonics in fiction
Cruise/Wagner Productions films
Fiction with unreliable narrators
Films about dreams
Films about altered memories
Films about road accidents and incidents
Films about stalking
Films about suicide
Films about telepresence
Films directed by Cameron Crowe
Films produced by Cameron Crowe
Films produced by Tom Cruise
Films set in the 22nd century
Films set in New York City
Films shot in New York City
Lucid dreams
American nonlinear narrative films
Paramount Pictures films
Films with screenplays by Cameron Crowe
Summit Entertainment films
Vinyl Films films
Works about plastic surgery
Impact of the September 11 attacks on cinema
Films about simulated reality
2000s American films